AirTouch Communications was an American wireless telephone service provider, created as a spin-off on Pacific Telesis on April 1, 1994. Its headquarters were in One California in the Financial District, San Francisco, California. After a series of mergers, the company's vestiges are now part of Verizon Wireless.

History

At the time of the Bell System divestiture in 1984, each Regional Bell Operating Company (Baby Bell) was given a portion of the Advanced Mobile Phone System (AMPS) network corresponding to its service area. Pacific Telesis, the Baby Bell covering California and Nevada, spun off its wireless services as AirTouch Communications in 1994.

US West's US West New Vector was also created from AMPS. In July 1994, U S West agreed to a joint venture with AirTouch as a prelude to merging the cellular unit into AirTouch. By 1996, all accounts were operated under the AirTouch name. Due to regulatory issues, the full merger was not completed until February 1998. As part of the merger, certain overlapping areas of coverage had to be sold to other wireless providers. Many of these went to GTE Wireless.

On June 30, 1999, AirTouch Communications merged with UK-based Vodafone, becoming Vodafone AirTouch, after rejecting overtures from Bell Atlantic Corporation. In September 1999, Vodafone AirTouch announced a $70-billion joint venture with Bell Atlantic to be called Verizon Wireless, which would be composed of the two companies' U.S. wireless assets, Bell Atlantic Mobile (another AMPS spinoff) and AirTouch Cellular. This wireless joint venture received regulatory approval in six months, and began operations as Verizon Wireless on April 4, 2000. On June 30, 2000, the addition of GTE Wireless' assets, in connection with the merger of Bell Atlantic and GTE to form Verizon Communications, made Verizon Wireless the nation's largest wireless communications provider. For the joint venture, Verizon Communications owns 55% and Vodafone owns 45%. In 2014, Verizon Communications purchased the 45% owned by Vodafone. AirTouch Paging was re-branded as Verizon Wireless Messaging Services.  In June 2006, Verizon Wireless sold the paging division to American Messaging Services, effectively ending Verizon Wireless Messaging Services.

Verizon Wireless still maintains a call center in some of the buildings that used to house AirTouch Cellular's call center and administrative offices.

In 1994, AirTouch was considered by some to be an innovative company in its approach to employee management. It invested in its employees in incentives, training, opportunities, and innovation. They focused on total quality management (TQM) which encouraged all employees to submit process improvement ideas annually following the Quality Blue Print Advantage. Notable were Benjamin Franklin ($100 bill) distributions with customer growth milestones from the GM/VP's desk without it being taxable and Right Things Right (internal employee recognition program).

Former employees often plan reunions to reminisce fondly about their experiences with the company.

Merger timeline

 AirTouch Communications was formed when Pacific Telesis spun off PacTel Cellular in 1994.
 In July 1994, AirTouch Communications and US West formed a joint venture to eventually merge their cellular operations.
 In May 1996, US West New Vector Group rebranded US West Cellular as AirTouch Cellular.
 In April 1997, AirTouch tried to buy US West New Vector but missed the Morris Trust filing deadline by one day.
 In February 1998, AirTouch Communications bought US West New Vector from US West Media for $5.7 billion. This made AirTouch the second largest wireless company in the US.
 In January 1999, Vodafone bid $62 billion for AirTouch.
 In June 1999, Vodafone Group Plc merged with AirTouch Communications, creating Vodafone Airtouch Plc.
 In September 1999, Bell Atlantic and Vodafone Airtouch agreed to merge their U.S. wireless operations (Bell Atlantic Mobile, AirTouch Cellular) to form Verizon Wireless.
 In April 2000, Verizon Wireless began operations—the creation of the Verizon Wireless brand marked the end of the AirTouch brand.
 In June, 2006, Verizon Wireless sold its paging division to American Messaging Services.

See also

References

External links
Archive of Airtouch Intercept Messages

1994 establishments in California
1999 mergers and acquisitions
2006 disestablishments in California
Companies based in San Francisco
Corporate spin-offs
Defunct companies based in the San Francisco Bay Area
Defunct mobile phone companies of the United States
Technology companies based in the San Francisco Bay Area
Telecommunications companies disestablished in 2006
Telecommunications companies established in 1994
Verizon Communications
Vodafone